XV is the twelfth studio album by American metal band King's X, released in May 2008. It is the band's second album after 2005's Ogre Tones to chart on the Billboard 200, peaking at No. 145. The album also charted on the Independent Albums chart (peaking at No. 12) and Billboard Comprehensive Albums (peaking at No. 167). The Roman numeral XV means 15, as this is their 15th album, counting live albums and compilations. Although King's X had continued to be active in the years after its release, XV was the band's last studio album until the 2022 release of their follow-up record Three Sides of One.

Track listing

All tracks written by Jerry Gaskill, dUg Pinnick and Ty Tabor

Personnel
Doug Pinnick – bass, lead vocals
Ty Tabor – guitar, vocals
Jerry Gaskill – drums, vocals
 Recorded, produced and mixed by Michael Wagener for Wire World Studio
 Mastered at Alien Beans Studios by Ty Tabor
 Additional background vocals – Wally Farkas, Tim Heap, Dave Williams, Bro. Jeremiah Loudenphat, Allen Thomason, and Michael Wagener

Art direction
 Graphic design and layout: Patrick Zahorodnuik
 Illustrations: Warren Flanagan Warren Flanagan designs
 Photography: Mark Weiss

Chart performance

References

2008 albums
King's X albums
Albums produced by Michael Wagener
Inside Out Music albums